The San Francisco Greek Film Festival (SFGFF), is a film festival held annually in San Francisco, United States which showcases Greek and Cypriot films and filmmakers from around the world. It is the first and longest-running Greek film festival in the United States. SFGFF is dedicated to recognizing, supporting, and promoting the best film work by Greek and Cypriot filmmakers from around the world. The festival has showcased over 300 movies and hosted 70 filmmakers and more than 15,000 attendees.

Awards 

Films at the SFGFF are nominated for the following awards:

 Jury Awards
 Best Narrative Feature
 Best Documentary
 Best Narrative Short
 The Astron Award
 Awarded annually to the audiences' favourite feature and short films
 Spyros P. Skouras Lifetime Achievement Award
 Created in 2018, The Spyros P. Skouras Lifetime Achievement Award honors outstanding film industry professionals of Greek descent.

See also 
 List of film festivals in North and Central America
 San Francisco
 Cinema of Greece
 Los Angeles Greek Film Festival
 List of Greece-related topics

References

External links 

 

Awards established in 2004
Recurring events established in 2004
Film markets
Film festivals in the San Francisco Bay Area